The Squaw Man is a 1905 western/drama stage play in four acts written by Edwin Milton Royle.

It debuted on October 23, 1905, at the Wallack's Theatre, Broadway, starring William Faversham in the title role, as Captain James Wynnegate also known as Jim Carson. The doomed bad man, Cash Hawkins, was played by William S. Hart. Directed by Edwin Milton Royle and William Faversham, The Squaw Man was produced by Liebler & Company.

Receiving significant critical acclaim, the play ran for 222 performances before closing on April 1, 1906.

The Squaw Man has had four Broadway revivals, in 1907, 1908, 1911 and 1921. The 1911 revival starring Dustin Farnum ran for only eight performances. The 1921 revival starring William Faversham at the Astor Theatre ran for 50 performances.

Synopsis

The first act of the play is set in England in the 1800s. The lead character is Capt. James Wynnegate. His older cousin, heir Henry Wynnegate, Earl of Kerhill, steals from the family trust fund and speculates heavily. Henry loses the fortune, causing them to default on a commitment to an orphans' home.

Capt. Wynnegate is in love with Henry's wife, Diana. She does not love her husband and returns the affection of the captain. As the money has been lost, Capt. Wynnegate agrees to leave England and take the blame. He is then accused of being a thief, which allows Henry to avoid suspicion and protects the name and the reputation of his wife.

He goes to the American "Wild West" of Montana, where he buys the Red Butte Ranch and makes a name for himself under the alias Jim Carson. In the second act, several years later, Henry and Diana show up. The villain, Cash Hawkins, is about to shoot Jim when the Ute Indian maiden, Nat-u-ritch, shoots Hawkins from the sidelines, killing him and saving Jim's life.

Nat-u-ritch, who is the daughter of Chief Tab-y-wana, rescues Jim several more times, which is revealed through exposition in the third act. They fall in love and have a son, Little Hal. Jim marries Nat-u-ritch. The marriage between a white man in his social position and an Indian woman is causes controversy among the denizens of Montana.

By the fourth act, more time has passed and Diana comes West again with news that Henry has died. An English solicitor shows up and persuades Jim that Hal should be taken to England and raised as the heir to the large Wynnegate estate. Jim agrees to send the boy away.

Nat-u-ritch discusses the issue with Jim, believing that their child should be raised with their parents and insisting that the boy should remain in Montana. Nat-u-ritch's father, Chief Tab-y-wana's gives Jim advice on the dispute. At the first sign of Nat-u-ritch's complaints, the chief advises Jim that: "if she will not obey, beat her. If she disobeys again, kill her."

Knowing that Jim has made up his mind to send the boy to be raised on the Wynnegate estate, and hearing that she will be arrested by the Marshals for killing Hawkins, Nat-u-ritch commits suicide. Jim makes the decision to bring his child back home to England and marry Diana. The play concludes with the Indian chief Tab-y-wana standing stoically erect with the corpse of Nat-u-ritch in his arms, a reversal of the usual Pieta.

Adaptations
The story has also been adapted into a novel, written by Julie Opp Faversham, a stage musical, and three films (1914, 1918 and 1931). All three films were directed by Cecil B. DeMille.

Opening night cast

Herbert Sleath as Henry Wynnegate
Adrienne Morrison as Nat-u-ritch (as Mabel Morrison)
Selene Johnson as Diana
Selina F. Royle as Lady Elizabeth Wynnegate
Katherine Fisher as Lady Mabel Wynnegate
William Faversham as Capt. James Wynnegate
Frederick Forrest as Rev. Belachazar Chiswick
C. A. Carlton as Bates
Hugo Toland as Malcolm Petrie
Cecil Ward as Sir John Applegate
William Elville as The Right Rev., Bishop of Exeter
Brigham Royce as Sir Charles Majoribanks
Ella Duncan as Mrs. Chichester Chichester Jones
George Fawcett as Big Bill, foreman
Emmett Shackelford as Shorty
Bertram A. Marburg as Andy
Mitchell Lewis as Grouchy
Baco White as himself
Theodore Roberts as Tab-y-wana
Evelyn Wright as Little Hal
William S. Hart as Cash Hawkins
Frederick Watson as Nick, the bar-keep
Mortimer Martini as McSorley
Wells Edward Knibloe as Parker
W. H. Sadler as Pete
Chester White as Parson
Joseph Judge as Punk
Lillian Wright as Mrs. Hiram Doolittle
Boyd Southey as Mr. Hiram Doolittle
William Frederick as Bud Hardy

References

External links

 

1905 plays
American plays adapted into films
Western (genre) plays
Plays set in England
Plays set in Montana